Douglas William McClelland (born 30 November 1949) is an English professional golfer who played on the European Tour from 1971 to 1979. In 1973 he won the Dutch Open and was runner-up in the Benson & Hedges Match Play Championship, losing to Neil Coles in the final. In 1977 he finished fourth in the Penfold PGA Championship and third in the Martini International behind a young Greg Norman.

McClelland was twice in contention for a Ryder Cup place. In 1973 he finished 22nd in the Ryder Cup points list but was a possible choice having shown good form in the tournaments just before the four selections were made. The selectors, however, chose the players in 9th to 12th place in the points list. In 1977 McClelland finished 10th in the points list but the selectors chose two experienced players, Tony Jacklin and Neil Coles, together with two rookies, Ken Brown and Mark James, who had finished 9th and 11th in the points list.

Professional wins (2)

European Tour wins (1)

Other wins (1)
1980 Sunningdale Foursomes (with Neil Coles)

Results in major championships

Note: McClelland only played in The Open Championship.

CUT = missed the half-way cut (3rd round cut in 1977 and 1978 Open Championships)
"T" = tied

Team appearances
Double Diamond International (representing England): 1972 (winners)
Japan-Britain Match (representing Great Britain): 1974 (winners)

References

External links

English male golfers
European Tour golfers
Sportspeople from South Shields
1949 births
Living people